Gregory Thomas Garcia (born April 4, 1970) is an American television director, producer and writer. He is the creator/executive producer of several long-running sitcoms, including Yes, Dear, My Name Is Earl (in which he made seven cameo appearances), The Guest Book, Sprung, and Raising Hope. He has also worked for the series Family Matters and as a consulting producer on Family Guy.

Early life
Garcia was born in Arlington County, Virginia. His parents Tom and Natalie Garcia raised Greg and his older sister Shelley  in the Pimmit Hills neighborhood of Fairfax County, Virginia and then North Arlington, Virginia.

After graduating in 1988 from Yorktown High School (also his mother's alma mater), Garcia attended Frostburg State University in Frostburg, Maryland, where he participated in the Warner Bros. outreach program Writing for Television courses, which ultimately opened the door for him as a writer in Hollywood.

Career
Garcia worked as a board operator and DJ for Tony Kornheiser on The Tony Kornheiser Show radio show on WTEM. He was also an intern for the Don and Mike Show radio program in Fairfax, Virginia.

Relocating to work in Hollywood, his early show business work included as an extra on the teen drama TV series Beverly Hills, 90210 and as a production assistant on Step by Step. In the mid-1990s, he began writing for sitcoms On Our Own and Family Matters (the show that spun off On Our Own), which led to co-writing the pilot for the short-lived series Built to Last with Warren Hutcherson  (1997). During the 2007–2008 Writers Guild of America strike, he worked as a cashier and janitor at a Burger King in Burbank, California.

Garcia wrote for, created, produced and directed the sitcoms Yes, Dear, Raising Hope, My Name Is Earl, The Guest Book. and Sprung. He won the Primetime Emmy Award for Outstanding Writing for a Comedy Series for My Name Is Earl in 2006.

Garcia co-wrote the book for the musical Escape to Margaritaville featuring the songs of Jimmy Buffett with Mike O'Malley.

Personal life
Garcia and his wife Kim have three sons, and they reside in the Los Angeles area. Kim and Greg attended the same college, Frostburg State University.

Garcia has been incorrectly labeled as a Scientologist, after reports in the Daily Mirror were amplified by actor Alec Baldwin. While several cast members on My Name is Earl cast were Scientologists, Garcia stated: 

During the 2007–08 Writers Guild of America strike, Garcia worked as a cashier and janitor at a Burger King in Southern California.

Filmography

References

External links

1970 births
Living people
American television directors
American television writers
American male television writers
Frostburg State University alumni
Showrunners
Primetime Emmy Award winners
People from Arlington County, Virginia
Screenwriters from Virginia
Television producers from Virginia
Yorktown High School (Virginia) alumni